Georges Aleksandrovich Duperron, born 24 September 1877, died 23 July 1934, was a Russian sports journalist, football organizer and one of the founders of the Olympic movement in Russia. He was of French descent.

Duperron was a footballer who played at the first ever football match in Russia. It was arranged on 24 October 1897 in Saint Petersburg. In 1901, he was one of the organizers of the first Russian football league, the St Petersburg Football League. After the establishment of the Russian Olympic Committee in 1911, Duperron was elected as its first secretary. From 1913 to 1915, he was a member of the International Olympic Committee. Duperron was also the first manager of the Russian Empire national football team as the team participated in the 1912 Summer Olympics in Stockholm.

Duperron published more than 30 books about football, athletics, gymnastics and winter sports. He wrote articles for the sport magazines Samokat, Le Cycliste and Sport.

His wife, Margarita Matveevna Duperron (Charskaya), born in 1908, a native of Vladivostok, not affiliated with any political party, after the death of her husband she lived at his expense, address: Leningrad, Zagorodny pr., 34, apt. 6. Arrested on January 18, 1938. On June 18, 1938, by the Commission of the NKVD and the USSR Prosecutor's Office, she was sentenced under Art. 58 of the Criminal Code of the RSFSR to capital punishment. Shot in Leningrad on July 9, 1938.

References

External links 

1877 births
1934 deaths
Writers from Saint Petersburg
Russian people of French descent
Journalists from the Russian Empire
Russian male journalists
Male writers from the Russian Empire
Russian football managers
International Olympic Committee members